Chuniophoenix is a genus of palm tree named after Chun Woon-Young, then director of the Botanical Institute, Sun Yat Sen University, Guangzhou. It contains three known species, native to southern China and Vietnam. Chuniophoenix is a member of tribe Chuniophoeniceae, a small group of palms that exhibit great morphological diversity and interesting biogeography. The tribe includes four genera: Chuniophoenix with 3 species in China and Vietnam, Kerriodoxa (monotypic) in Peninsular Malaysia and Thailand, Nannorrhops (monotypic) from Arabia to Afghanistan, and Tahina (monotypic) in Madagascar.

References

 
Arecaceae genera
Taxonomy articles created by Polbot
Taxa named by Max Burret